USS O-9 (SS-70) was an O-class submarine of the United States Navy. Her keel was laid down on 15 February 1917 at Fore River Shipbuilding Company of Quincy, Massachusetts. She was launched on 27 January 1918 sponsored by Mrs. Frederick J. Sherman, and commissioned on 27 July 1918.

Service history
During the final months of World War I, O-9 operated on coastal patrol and protected the Atlantic coast from U-boats. She departed Newport, Rhode Island, on 2 November 1918 for Britain, in order to conduct her first war patrol. However, the end of the war came before O-9 reached Europe.

After the war, O-9 continued in Naval service and trained submarine crews at the Submarine School at New London, Connecticut. Proceeding to Coco Solo, Panama Canal Zone, in 1924, the boat was reclassified to a second line submarine during her year there. Returning to operate at New London, O-9 reverted to a first line submarine on 6 June 1928. Sailing up to Portsmouth, New Hampshire in January 1930, the submarine returned to New London in March; the following February, she sailed to Philadelphia, Pennsylvania, to decommission there on 25 June 1931.

Remaining on the Naval Vessel Register, O-9 was recalled to training service as American involvement in World War II became more inevitable. The 12 s were already nearing completion and 73  boats had already been ordered when O-9 was recommissioned at Philadelphia, on 14 April 1941, and went to New London on 31 May.

In all, eight of the original ten O-boats were recommissioned to serve as training submarines in the Second World War. (The  had been sunk after a collision in 1923 and the O-1 had been scrapped in 1938.) O-9, in particular, required extensive work, and still suffered mechanical problems even after being returned to service.

Finally, at 08:37, O-9 began her dive. At 10:32, O-9 had not returned to the surface.

Rescue ships swung into action immediately. Sister ships O-6 and O-10, submarine , submarine rescue ship , and other ships searched for O-9. That evening, pieces of debris with markings from O-9 were recovered.

Divers went down from 13:00 on 21 June until 11:43 on 22 June. Divers could stay only a short time at the  depth but nonetheless set endurance and depth records for salvage operations until those operations were cancelled, as they were considered too risky. Rescue operations were discontinued on 22 June. The boat and her 33 officers and men were declared lost as of 20 June. On 22 June, Secretary of the Navy Frank Knox conducted memorial services for the 33 officers and men lost on the boat.

Wreck

On 20 September 1997, based on several years of research by Glen M. Reem, O-9 was finally located. Salem, New Hampshire-based Klein Sonar Company provided a vessel and sonar equipment which were used to discover O-9s final resting place. Her hull has been crushed from just abaft the conning tower all the way to the stern, though the forward hull appeared intact. There are no plans to salvage O-9. Her exact location is secret and the area has been designated an official Naval burial ground.

O-9 was struck from the Naval Vessel Register on 23 October 1941.

In popular culture

In H.P. Lovecraft's short story The Shadow Over Innsmouth, written in 1931, a US Navy submarine is described as firing torpedoes into the undersea habitation of Deep Ones off the fictional Innsmouth, Massachusetts. More recently, and following Lovecraft's own pretense of presenting a pseudo-historical tale, Kenneth Hite and Kennon Bauman have depicted the submarine as being O-9 in their book The Cthulhu Wars. In doing so they presented the vessel's loss in 1941 as having been related to the fictional torpedo attack on the Deep Ones. They even mentioned the actual commander of O-9 in 1927-28, Lieutenant J.T. Acree. Another real-life vessel mentioned by Hite and Bauman is the USCGC General Greene (WPC-140; later WSC-140 and WMEC-140), which served in the United States Coast Guard from 1927 until decommissioning on 15 November 1968; this cutter was sold in 1976.

References

External links

On Eternal Patrol: USS O-9
Remote-Sensing Survey for the Remains of the Submarine USS O-9 (SS-70) - NOAA
Deep Sea Detectives - The Forgotten Sub of WWII - Amazon.com

 

United States O-class submarines
World War I submarines of the United States
United States submarine accidents
Lost submarines of the United States
Shipwrecks of the New Hampshire coast
Ships built in Quincy, Massachusetts
1918 ships
Maritime incidents in June 1941
Warships lost with all hands